Jüri Reintalu (also Jüri Reinthal; 1895–?) was an Estonian politician. He was a member of I Riigikogu. He was a member of the Riigikogu since 16 July 1921. He replaced Mihkel Haus. On 15 November 1921, he resigned his position and he was replaced by Aleksander Prass.

References

1895 births
Year of death missing
Central Committee of Tallinn Trade Unions politicians
Members of the Riigikogu, 1920–1923